Andrew Painter (born 18 July 1975) is a former professional tennis player from Australia.

Career
Painter was a doubles specialist and appeared in the men's doubles main draw of the Australian Open three times, with Neil Borwick in 1996, Jamie Holmes in 1997 and Toby Mitchell in 1999. He wasn't able to progress past the first round in any of his appearances but did make the second round of the 1998 Wimbledon Championships, partnering Holmes. The pair defeated Czechs David Škoch and Petr Luxa. 

He played in the main singles draw at the 1995 Wimbledon Championships and faced top seed Andre Agassi on centre court in the opening round. The Australian was beaten in straight sets.

At the 2000 Grand Prix Hassan II, an ATP Tour tournament, Painter and Lars Burgsmüller made the doubles final, which they lost to Arnaud Clément and Sébastien Grosjean. He won four Challenger doubles titles during his career.

ATP career finals

Doubles: 1 (0–1)

Challenger titles

Doubles: (4)

References

1975 births
Living people
Australian male tennis players
Tennis people from Tasmania